This is a list of schools in York, in the English county of North Yorkshire.

State-funded schools

Primary schools 

Acomb Primary School, Acomb
Archbishop of York's CE Junior School, Bishopthorpe
Badger Hill Primary Academy, Badger Hill
Bishopthorpe Infant School, Bishopthorpe
Burton Green Primary School, Clifton
Carr Infant School, Acomb
Carr Junior School, Acomb
Clifton Green Primary School, Clifton
Clifton with Rawcliffe Primary School, Rawcliffe
Copmanthorpe Primary School, Copmanthorpe
Dringhouses Primary School, Dringhouses
Dunnington CE Primary School, Dunnington
Elvington CE Primary School, Elvington
Fishergate Primary School, Fishergate
Haxby Road Primary School, Clifton
Headlands Primary School, Haxby
Hempland Primary School, Heworth
Heworth CE Primary Academy, Heworth
Hob Moor Community Primary Academy, Acomb
Huntington Primary Acaademy, Huntington
Knavesmire Primary School, South Bank
Lakeside Primary Academy, Clifton Moor
Lord Deramore's Primary School, Heslington
Naburn CE Primary School, Naburn
New Earswick Primary School, New Earswick
Osbaldwick Primary Academy, Osbaldwick
Our Lady Queen of Martyrs RC Primary School, Holgate 
Park Grove Primary Academy, Layerthorpe
Poppleton Ousebank Primary School, Upper Poppleton
Poppleton Road Primary School, Holgate
Ralph Butterfield Primary School, Haxby
Robert Wilkinson Primary School, Strensall
Rufforth Primary School, Rufforth
St Aelred's RC Primary School, Tang Hall
St Barnabas CE Primary School, Holgate
St George's RC Primary School, Fishergate
St Lawrence's CE Primary Academy, Heslington
St Mary's CE Primary School, Askham Richard
St Oswald's CE Primary School, Fulford
St Paul's CE Primary School, Holgate
St Wilfrid's RC Primary School, Layerthorpe
Scarcroft Primary School, South Bank
Skelton Primary School, Skelton
Stockton-on-the-Forest Primary School, Stockton-on-the-Forest
Tang Hall Primary Academy, Tang Hall
Westfield Primary School, Acomb
Wheldrake with Thorganby CE Primary School, Wheldrake
Wigginton Primary School, Wigginton
Woodthorpe Primary School, Woodthorpe
Yearsley Grove Primary School, Huntington

Secondary schools 

All Saints Roman Catholic School, South Bank
Archbishop Holgate's School, Tang Hall
Fulford School, Fulford
Huntington School, Huntington
Joseph Rowntree School, New Earswick
Manor Church of England Academy, Nether Poppleton
Millthorpe School, South Bank
Vale of York Academy, Clifton Without
York High School, Acomb

Special and alternative schools 
Applefields School, Tang Hall
Danesgate Community, Fulford
Hob Moor Oaks Academy, Acomb

Further education 
Askham Bryan College
York College

Independent schools

Primary and preparatory schools 
St Peter's 2-8, Clifton
York Steiner School, Fulford

Senior and all-through schools 
Bootham School, Bootham
The Mount School, South Bank
OneSchool Global UK, Middlethorpe
St Peter's School, Clifton

References

 
York
Schools in York
York